Siphumelele Nkosikhona Petros Msutwana (born 31 October 1993 in Fort Beaufort) is a South African rugby union player for the  in the Currie Cup and in the Rugby Challenge. His regular position is winger.

Career

Youth

In 2006, he was included in the squad for the 2006 Under-13 Craven Week tournament. In 2009, he played at the Under-16 Grant Khomo Week. He also played at Under-18 level at both the 2010 Academy Week and 2011 Craven Week competitions.

He joined the  Academy for 2012, where he played for the  side during the 2012 Under-19 Provincial Championship competition.

Senior career

He was included in the  senior side for the 2014 Vodacom Cup season.

References

1993 births
Living people
People from Raymond Mhlaba Local Municipality
Xhosa people
South African rugby union players
Eastern Province Elephants players
Rugby union players from the Eastern Cape
Rugby union wings